Kalkini Syed Abul Hossain University College is a higher secondary school as well as a degree college affiliated to the National University. It is situated in Madaripur, Bangladesh. It was founded by Member of Parliament Syed Abul Hossain. It is one of the oldest and renowned college in Madaripur District.

History 
The college was established in Kalkini, Madaripur in July, 1972. It was established by Syed Abul Hossain because of the crisis in the education sector of the new born Bangladesh.

Campus 
The college contains the central administrative offices and main libraries of the college, academic buildings including two hostels for boys and girls.

Academic program 
 Higher Secondary: Arts, Business Studies and Science
 B. Com: Social Science, Business Studies and Science
 Honors: Bengali, English, Political Science, History, Social Work, Management, Accounting, Marketing, Mathematics and Physics
 Masters: Bengali, Political Science

Library 
The library was established in 1972 at the time of establishment of the college. There are 20,000 books in the library with well decorated reading room.

Faculty and staff 
 Regular Teacher: 57
 Part-time Teacher: 10
 Office Staff: 20

Dormitories 
Kalkini Syed Abul Hossain University College has 2 dormitories: one for boys, another one for girls.

References

External links
 Kalkini Syed Abul Hossain University College

Schools in Madaripur District